The Immediate Geographic Region of Abaeté is one of the 6 immediate geographic regions in the Intermediate Geographic Region of Divinópolis, one of the 70 immediate geographic regions in the Brazilian state of Minas Gerais and one of the 509 of Brazil, created by the National Institute of Geography and Statistics (IBGE) in 2017.

Municipalities 
It comprises 5 municipalities.

 Abaeté  
 Biquinhas   
 Cedro do Abaeté    
 Morada Nova de Minas   
 Paineiras

See also 

 List of Intermediate and Immediate Geographic Regions of Minas Gerais

References 

Geography of Minas Gerais